Garang Diing Akuong (born 1963) is a South Sudanese politician and diplomat.
As a Bachelor of Arts in international relations from the University of London in 2004 he returned to the Southern Sudan Autonomous Region (2005–11).
In 2006 he was elected to the South Sudan assembly.
From 2006 to 2007 he was also general secretary in the Ministry of Foreign Affairs in Khartoum.
He then took up government posts in Northern Bahr el Ghazal state, which includes Aweil.
Until 2008 he was state minister of health.
In 2008 he was minister of parliamentary affairs.
From 2008 to 2009 he was state minister of agriculture  and minister of finance until 2010.
In 2010 he joined the national government as Minister of Energy and Mining.
From July 10, 2011 to  he Minister of Energy and Mining in the Cabinet of South Sudan headed by Salva Kiir Mayardit.
From  to  he was Ministry of Commerce, Industry and Investment (South Sudan).
Since  he is South Sudanese Ambassador to the United States.

See also
 SPLM
 SPLA
 Cabinet of South Sudan

References

Living people
Government ministers of South Sudan
Ambassadors of South Sudan to the United States
1963 births